The French ambassador to the United States is the diplomatic representation of the French Republic to the United States. They reside in Washington, D.C.  The current ambassador is Philippe Étienne.

List of Ambassadors

References

 
United States
France